Campolongo Tapogliano is a commune of   the Italian region Friuli-Venezia Giulia which was created in 2009 by the fusion of the former communes of Campolongo al Torre and Tapogliano.

Twin towns
Campolongo Tapogliano is twinned with:

  Montgiscard, France, since 2005

References

States and territories established in 2009